David Gregory Hawkins (born October 28, 1982) is an American professional basketball player. He is a 1.95 m (6 ft 4¾ in) tall shooting guard.

College career
Hawkins played college basketball at Temple University for John Chaney's Owls. He became the team's leader after being reinstated to it from a suspension due to bad grades. He was named to the 2002–03 Atlantic 10 Conference All-Atlantic 10 Conference Second Team and to the 2003–04 Atlantic 10 Conference All-Atlantic 10 Conference First Team, averaging 16.9 and 24.4 points per game respectively.

Professional career
Hawkins was signed to the Houston Rockets for a brief period of time. He was later released from the team and signed with Sebastiani Rieti, then in the Italian second division. He currently plays for Trilogy which is an American men's 3-on-3 basketball team that plays in the BIG3. Trilogy won the inaugural season of the BIG 3 in 2017, completing a perfect season.

Virtus Roma
He agreed to play for Italian powerhouse Virtus Roma in March 2005. Hawkins finished the season with an average of 17.1 points per game. During the next season, he shined in ULEB's Eurocup, averaging 18.5 points per game, but also showing great versatility and leading the competition in steals with 2.9 per game. Roma reached the quarter final and Hawkins showed he was ready for Europe's highest stage, the Euroleague.

Spending two more seasons in Roma, Hawkins helped the team regain something of its past glory by qualifying twice to the Euroleague's Top 16. During those two Euroleague seasons, he averaged 13.6 and 10.9 points per game. Nevertheless, at the end of the 2007–08 season, team manager Dejan Bodiroga decided not to renew his contract.

Armani Jeans Milano
After that, Hawkins signed with another Italian Euroleague team, Armani Jeans Milano, leading it up to the finals, lost against Montepaschi Siena. On February 15, 2009 he scored a career-high 35 points against Montegranaro, also adding 10 rebounds.

Montepaschi Siena
In 2009, he moved to Montepaschi Siena where he played with former Atlantic 10 rival Romain Sato. In July 2010 he returned to play for Olimpia Milano.

Beşiktaş Milangaz
On August 19, 2011, Hawkins signed a one-year contract with the Turkish team Beşiktaş Milangaz. On February 18, 2012, Hawkins led the team to their first Turkish Cup win averaging 9.8 points, 3.3 assists and 29.3 minutes. On April 29, 2012, he won the EuroChallenge Cup with Beşiktaş Milangaz scoring 13 points and 4 assists in the final. In June 2012, he won the Turkish League Champions with Beşiktaş Milangaz.

Galatasaray Medical Park
On August 16, 2012, Hawkins signed a three-year contract with the Turkish team Galatasaray Medical Park. However, Hawkins failed a doping test after the Gaziantep Büyükşehir Belediyespor game in December 2012 and was banned from professional basketball for four years by the Turkish Basketball Federation. The substance detected in his blood was Methylecgonine, a common metabolite of cocaine. After the decision, Hawkins’ contract with Galatasaray was cancelled.

The Basketball Tournament (TBT)
In the summer of 2015, Hawkins competed in The Basketball Tournament for the City of Gods. Alongside former NBA players James Gist, Dermarr Johnson, Pops Mensah-Bonsu and Michael Sweetney, Hawkins helped guide the City of Gods to the 2015 TBT Championship Game where they lost 84–71 to Overseas Elite. In their 2017 first-round matchup against Gael Nation, a team composed of Iona College basketball alum, Hawkins scored 17 points and grabbed 4 rebounds in the City of Gods' 88–86 loss.

References

External links 
 Italian League Profile 
 Turkish League Profile
 Euroleague Profile
 TBLStat.net Profile

1982 births
Living people
American expatriate basketball people in Italy
American expatriate basketball people in Turkey
Basketball players from Washington, D.C.
Beşiktaş men's basketball players
Big3 players
American men's basketball players
Galatasaray S.K. (men's basketball) players
Mens Sana Basket players
Nuova AMG Sebastiani Basket Rieti players
Olimpia Milano players
Pallacanestro Virtus Roma players
Shooting guards
Small forwards
Temple Owls men's basketball players
American men's 3x3 basketball players